Women in the Philippine National Police are women in the Philippines who joined the police force in the Philippines to become policewomen and law enforcers.

When Filipino women started to join the male-dominated Philippine National Police (PNP), they were given only assignments that were administrative in nature and jobs that could be classified and described as "desk duties". Within the following thirty years - years after the establishment of the PNP in the early period of the 1990s, female Filipino police officers have participated in other police activities and functions, including risky PNP operations. They have also become commanders in the field of police work. Among the Filipino policewomen who excelled in the PNP were Lina Sarmiento and Lorlie Arroyo.

In 2012, Sarmiento and Arroyo were the only two "female generals" in the Philippine National Police. They were both Chief Superintendents, with Sarmiento being the head of the Police Security and Protection Group (PSPG), while Arroyo was the head of the Crime Laboratory of the Philippine National Police. Arroyo's rank was equivalent to the rank of a brigadier general in the military. In June 2012, Sarmiento was promoted to become the "first two-star female general" of the Philippine National Police and the "first female general to be named in the Directorial Staff of the PNP" since the inception of the Philippine National Police.

As of June 2012, there were 11,000 Filipino policewomen within the Philippine National Police, an organization that at the time had a total of 143,000 police officers.

See also
Women in the Philippine military

References

External links

Philippines
Women in the Philippines
Law enforcement in the Philippines
Philippine National Police
Filipino women
Filipino women by occupation